Adrián Arguedas Ruano (born 1968) is a Costa Rican contemporary artist who works in painting, printmaking and sculpture.

Early life and education
Arguedas was born and raised in Barva de Heredia. He graduated from the School of Arts and Visual Communication of the National University of Costa Rica  in 1990 with a Bachelor of Arts degree. Between 1993-1994, he studied  engraving at the École des beaux arts in Lorient, France. In 2000, he received a Master of Fine Arts degree from the University of Miami, Florida, United States.

Arguedas is a professor in the School of Arts and Visual Communication at the Universidad Nacional de Costa Rica.

Collections
Museo de Arte Costarricense, San José, Costa Rica
Museo de Arte y Diseño Contemporáneo, San José, Costa Rica
Marcelo Narvona, Ciudad de Panamá, Panamá
Museum of Latin American Art Long Beach, California
Caja Costarricense de Seguro Social, San José, Costa Rica
Museos de Banco Central, San José, Costa Rica

Awards
In 1994, 2004 and 2007, Arguedas received the  Premio Nacional Aquileo J. Echeverría award, which is the highest award in Costa Rica in the field of visual arts. In 2019 he received the Francisco Amighetti National Visual Arts Award in sculpture for his exhibition El Aprediz.

Selected exhibitions

2004 
 Cuidado ¡Pinta! o (De)construcciones pictóricas, Museum of Contemporary Art and Design, San Jose, Costa Rica
 Toda Incluida, repetición del MADC, Conde Duque, Madrid, España.
 Play Land y Estrategias, Galería Añil, Managua, Nicaragua.

2007 
 Super Héroes, *Museo de Arte Costarricense. San José, Costa Rica
 Trans, Centro Cultural Español, Ciudad de Guatemala, Guatemala.
 Estrecho Dudoso, Museo Nacional, San Jose, Costa Rica.

2008 
 Super Héroes, Museo de Arte Contemporáneo, Santiago de Chile.
 Pintura, un Proyecto Inconcluso, Centro Cultural español, Antigua, Guatemala.

2011 
 Grabados-Adrian Arguedas, Casa de las Americas, La Habana, Cuba.
 Copista(s), Museo Dr. Calderón Guardia, San Jose, Costa Rica.
 Valoarte, Antigua Aduana, San Jose, Costa Rica.

2013 
Construcciones, Invenciones, Museo de Arte y Diseño Contemporáneo, San Jose, Costa Rica.

2019 
El Aprendiz, Museo del Banco Central de Costa Rica, San Jose.
 "Gráfica America", Museum of Latin American Art, Long Beach, California

Books
"El Aprendiz" Adrian Arguedas Ruano  | Maria Jose Monge Picado | 1ed. 104Pgs.. 28x22cm | Fundación Museos Banco Central de Costa Rica, 2019
"Grabados" Adrian Arguedas Ruano  | Efrain Hernández | 1ed. 39Pgs. 28cm | Prensa Digital WILKO, San José, 2014.
"SUPER HEROES" Adrian Arguedas Ruano  | Calvo Campos Esteban | 1ed. 70Pgs.. 28cm | San José: Museo de Arte Costarricense, 2007

References 

1968 births
Living people
Contemporary painters
20th-century Costa Rican painters
21st-century Costa Rican painters